Wisma Bapa Malaysia also known as Bangunan Tunku Abdul Rahman is the Sarawak state secretariat building housing various government departments, including the Premier's office. It is located in Petra Jaya, Kuching. Wisma Bapa Malaysia was designed to be similar to the Malaysian Houses of Parliament in Kuala Lumpur in many aspects.

History 

Since its inception in August 1976, the building is sited on  manicured gardens. The foundation stone of the Wisma Bapa Malaysia complex was laid by the first Prime Minister of Malaysia, the late Tunku Abdul Rahman Putra Al-Haj, on 30 August 1973 at the satellite township of Petra Jaya. The building was completed in 1976 and officially opened by the Yang di-Pertuan Agong, Tuanku Yahya Petra of Kelantan on 17 August 1976 followed by the Rulers' Conference in the building complex.

State assembly building

This building complex also housed the August Institution (state assembly building) from August 1976 until May 2009. The state assembly later moved to the  New Sarawak State Legislative Assembly Building after the period. Assembly sittings were held in the August House for over a period of 33 years. As the oldest August Institution in Malaysia, the Sarawak State Legislative Assembly was established after its inaugural meeting in Bintulu, Sarawak on 8 September 1867. The three-floor building can accommodate about 1,000 people, with 160 seats and a gallery for 224 people.

As of April 2012, the building is under a very bad condition since the state assembly moved to the new building. No refurbishment plans on the building were made.

See also

 The Astana, Sarawak

References

State secretariat buildings in Malaysia
Buildings and structures in Kuching
1976 establishments in Malaysia